Grzegorz Ekiert is Professor of Government at Harvard University, Director of Minda de Gunzburg Center for European Studies and Senior Scholar at the Harvard Academy for International and Area Studies. His teaching and research interests focus on comparative politics, regime change and democratization, civil society and social movements, and East European politics and societies.

Career
Ekiert is a native of Poland. He graduated with an MA in sociology from Uniwersytet Jagiellonski in Kraków in 1980. He completed his PhD in sociology at Harvard University in 1991. He was a lecturer in sociology at Uniwersytet Jagiellonski (1980–1984). Since 1991, he has been a member of the faculty at Harvard's Department of Government. He was Jean Monet Fellow at the European University Institute (2001–2002), The 21st Century COE Program Fellow at Hokkaido University (2007), Fernand Braudel Senior Fellow at European University Institute (2009–2010) and a visiting fellow at Collegio Carlo Alberto (2010 and 2014).

Publications
He is the author of The State Against Society: Political Crises and Their Aftermath in East Central Europe (1996), Rebellious Civil Society: Popular Protest and Democratic Consolidation in Poland, with (Jan Kubik 1999) that was awarded the Orbis Book prize by the American Association for the Advancement of Slavic Studies and Capitalism and Democracy in Central and Eastern Europe: Assessing the Legacy of Communist Rule, (co-edited with Stephen Hanson 2003). He edited special issues of East European Politics and Societies on the EU Eastward Enlargement (with Jan Zielonka) 2003 and on Democracy in Postcommunist World (2007) and special issue of Taiwan Journal of Democracy (2012). His papers appeared in numerous social science journals and edited volumes.

Ekiert is also Senior Faculty Associate at the Davis Center for Russian and Eurasian Studies, Ukrainian Research Institute and Weatherhead Center for International Affairs. He is also a member of the Club of Madrid Advisory Committee and a member of the advisory board of WZB Berlin Social Science Center.

Education
M.A. Jagiellonian University, Poland, Institute of Sociology (1980);
M.A. Harvard University, Department of Sociology (1987);
Ph.D. Harvard University, Department of Sociology (1991)

Research interests
Comparative politics, regime change and democratization, civil society, collective action and social movements, and East European politics and society.

Current projects

His current projects explore patterns of civil society development in new democracies in Central Europe and East Asia, the state of democracy in postcommunist world, the EU membership impact on post-communist democracies, and state mobilized contention in authoritarian and hybrid regimes.

Selected publications
Capitalism and Democracy in Central and Eastern Europe: Assessing the Legacy of Communist Rule, (co-editor Stephen Hanson), Cambridge University Press, 2003

Rebellious Civil Society. Popular Protest and Democratic Consolidation in Poland, (co-author Jan Kubik, Rutgers University) University of Michigan Press 1999

The State Against Society: Political Crises and Their Aftermath in East Central Europe, Princeton University Press 1996

“Three Generations of Research on Post-Communist Politics – A Sketch,” in: East European Politics and Societies (May 2015) Vol. 29, No. 2, pp. 323–337.

“Myths and Realities of Civil Society,” (co-author Jan Kubik) Journal of Democracy (January 2014) Vol. 25, No. 1, pp. 46–58.

“Democracy in Central and Eastern Europe 100 years On,” (co-author Daniel Ziblatt) in: East European Politics and Societies (February 2013) Vol. 27, No. 1, pp. 88–105

“The End of Communism in Central and Eastern Europe: The Last Middle Class Revolution?” in: Political Power and Social Theory, Vol. 21, 2010, pp. 99–123.

“Dilemmas of Europeanization: Eastern and Central Europe after the EU Enlargement, Acta Slavica Iaponica 2008, vol. 25, pp. 1–28

“Democracy in Postcommunist World: An Unending Quest,” co-authors Jan Kubik and Milada Anna Vachudova), East European Politics and Societies, Vol. 21: 1, 2007, pp. 1–24.

"Introduction: Academic Boundaries and Path Dependencies Facing The EU's Eastward Enlargement," (co-author Jan Zielonka) special issue of East European Politics and Societies, 2003, pp. 2–19.

"The State after State Socialism: Poland in Comparative Perspective," in: The Nation-State in Question, edited by John Hall and John Ikenberry, Princeton University Press 2003, pp. 291–320.

"Contentious Politics in New Democracies: Hungary, the former East Germany, Poland and Slovakia," (co-author Jan Kubik), World Politics (July 1998) 50, 4, pp. 547–581

Notes

References

Political science educators
Living people
Fernand Braudel Fellows
Harvard Graduate School of Arts and Sciences alumni
Year of birth missing (living people)